The supraorbital foramen, is a bony elongated opening located above the orbit (eye socket) and under the forehead. It is part of the frontal bone of the skull. The supraorbital foramen lies directly under the eyebrow. In some people this foramen is incomplete and is then known as the supraorbital notch.

Structure 
The supraorbital foramen is a small groove at superior and medial margin of the orbit in the frontal bone. It is part of the frontal bone of the skull. It arches transversely below the superciliary arches and is the upper part of the brow ridge. It is thin and prominent in its lateral two-thirds, but rounded in its medial third. Between these two parts, the supraorbital nerve, the supraorbital artery, and the supraorbital vein pass. The supraorbital nerve divides into superficial and deep branches after it has left the supraorbital foramen.

Additional images

See also
 Foramina of skull
 Frontal bone
 Supraorbital ridge

References

External links
 

Foramina of the skull